The Orange Line Bikeway is a cycle route in Los Angeles County, California that runs   and “spans the lengths of the San Fernando Valley’s major communities” from Chatsworth to North Hollywood,  “connecting such places as Pierce College, the Sepulveda Basin Recreation Area, the Van Nuys Government Center and Valley College.”

The Orange Line Bikeway's “seventeen-point-nine miles of exclusive, smooth, and lush active mobility glory” runs alongside the G Line bus rapid transit route. The Orange Line Bikeway is one of two major bicycle routes in Los Angeles that share dedicated rights-of-way with mass transit, the other being the Expo Line Bikeway in west L.A.

The Class I off-street bike path section  of the Bikeway runs from Chatsworth station to approximately Valley College station. The  section on Chandler Boulevard is a Class II on-street bike lane (beginning on the west between Coldwater Canyon and Fulton Avenue, near the Ethel Avenue crossing, and continuing to North Hollywood station on the east).

UCLA cycling advocates named the Orange Line Bike Path one of the “six best places to bike in L.A.” One guide to Los Angeles cycling notes, “While the path provides a traffic-free, safe ride, users have to stop when crossing streets that run perpendicular to it. For cyclists, stopping every so often reduces their overall ability to maintain the flow of an uninterrupted ride. That’s why the Orange Line Bicycle Path is suitable for casual, recreational riding over hardcore cycling or training.”

In the west at Chatsworth station it connects to the  Browns Creek Bike Path. The bike path also connects readily to the bike paths of the Sepulveda Dam Recreation Area. Because of the long reach of the extended path, this route has been called a “San Fernando Valley commuter corridor” and “the crown jewel of San Fernando Valley bike infrastructure.”

History 

The path (“decorated with native plants and public art”) was opened in 2005 with a  route between Warner Center and North Hollywood. The county added  in 2012 “between Canoga station and the Chatsworth train station.”

The construction project included bioswales to reduce water pollution from urban runoff and “recycled construction debris from the 405 expansion project “crushed and used as an underground base.”

Access 
According to the website of County Supervisor Zev Yaroslavsky, “Most of the wide, asphalt-surfaced path has separate, dedicated lanes for bicyclists and pedestrians. Still, there are some 'multiuse' areas in which walkers and cyclists will share space. Wider-than-usual  curb ramps also will allow cyclists and pedestrians to get on and off the path more easily, especially when it’s crowded.”

For those wishing to transfer from the bike path to the bus and vice versa, “G (Orange) Line buses pretty much all hold three bikes, though racks fill quickly, so it’s easiest to board at the ends of the line in North Hollywood or Chatsworth.”

A 2015 study of “cycling transit users” (CTUs) of the G Line found: “(1) CTUs are more likely to be stranded during weekday nights due to the proximity to three major colleges; on weekends, CTUs are more likely to be stranded in the mornings; (2) Metro’s policy that increased evening service during 2013 successfully decreased the number of stranded cyclists; and (3) when the racks are two-thirds full, approximately 20 percent of buses will strand at least one cyclist.”

Dedicated ”park and ride” parking lots are available at Chatsworth, Sherman Way, Canoga, Pierce College, Reseda, Balboa, Sepulveda, Van Nuys and North Hollywood stations.

There are bike racks at every G Line stop along with bike lockers available for rent.

Hazards 
There is a “dangerous blind curve on the east end of the Canoga Avenue station.”

Transient encampments and overgrown landscaping may intermittently obstruct the path.

Improvements
Overpass bridges for the bike/pedestrian path are being built at the Sepulveda Boulevard and Van Nuys Boulevard crossings. Scheduled completion date is 2025. This improvement is on the Twenty-Eight by ‘28 project list in anticipation of the 2028 Summer Games in Los Angeles.

See also
 List of Los Angeles bike paths
 Tujunga Greenbelt

External links
 Bike Travel in the SFV — The Orange Line Bike Path
 labikepaths.com Orange Line Bike Path
 Biking in LA: Orange Line bike path tag archive
 Urbanize LA: Orange Line

VIDEOS
 STREETFILMS: L.A.’s Orange Line bus rapid transit plus bike path!
 Orange Line Bike Path Warner Center to Chatsworth (17 min)
 Metro Orange bike path westbound (14 min)

MAPS 
 Los Angeles Bikeway Map (Metro.net) - HTML
  Los Angeles Bikeway Map (Metro.net) - PDF hosted on Dropbox

References

Bike paths in Los Angeles
G Line (Los Angeles Metro)
Rail trails in California
Parks in Los Angeles
Parks in the San Fernando Valley
Transportation in the San Fernando Valley
Canoga Park, Los Angeles
Lake Balboa, Los Angeles
North Hollywood, Los Angeles
Tarzana, Los Angeles
Van Nuys, Los Angeles
Winnetka, Los Angeles